This is a list of tallest structures in South Africa.

Tallest Structures 
Excludes all buildings and demolished or destroyed structures. There are currently 36 structures in this list.

Tallest Destroyed or Demolished Structures 

Timeline of tallest structures in South Africa 
Timeline of tallest structures  over 100 m (330 ft). Includes all structures. Excludes all demolished or destroyed structures.

Sources

 http://www.lib.utexas.edu/maps/tpc/txu-pclmaps-oclc-22834566_q-4d.jpg
 http://www.lib.utexas.edu/maps/tpc/txu-pclmaps-oclc-22834566_q-4c.jpg
 http://www.lib.utexas.edu/maps/tpc/txu-pclmaps-oclc-22834566_q-5a.jpg
 http://www.lib.utexas.edu/maps/tpc/txu-pclmaps-oclc-22834566_q-5d.jpg

Tallest
South Africa
South Africa